Arnhold is a surname. Notable people with the surname include:

Harry Edward Arnhold (1879–1950), British hotelier.
Henry H. Arnhold (1921–2018), American banker and philanthropist.
Johann Samuel Arnhold (1766–1828), German painter.
Mirella Arnhold (born 1983), Brazilian alpine skier.